The starry weever, or streaked weever, Trachinus radiatus, is a fish of the family Trachinidae widespread in the eastern Atlantic from Gibraltar to the Gulf of Guinea, and probably further south; it is also known from the Mediterranean Sea.

Description
The starry weever is moderately laterally compressed. The eyes are small, the snout is short and blunt, and the operculum bears a robust venomous spine. Five fan-shaped groups of bony ridges are on the top of the head just behind the eye. The dorsal fin is in two parts, the anterior portion has six or seven spines and the posterior portion has no spines, but 24 to 29 soft rays. The anal fin has two spines and 25 to 29 soft rays. The dorsal colouring is generally whitish, yellowish, or grey, sometimes with some violet or pinkish shades on the head and neck. Numerous brownish or blackish speckles are on the back and sides, some, especially on the flanks near the lateral line, forming ring shapes.

Behaviour
Like other members of the weever family, the starry weever lives on the seabed, burying itself in the sediment so that only its eyes and the anterior dorsal fin are above the surface. Poison glands are located at the base of this fin and on the spine on the gill cover. This fish is an ambush predator, remaining stationary in the sand ready to grab any passing prey of suitable size with its wide, upward-pointing mouth. Its diet consists largely of shrimp and other crustaceans, and small fish.

References

starry weever
Fish of the East Atlantic
Fish of the Mediterranean Sea
Marine fauna of West Africa
Marine fauna of North Africa
Fish of Angola
Fauna of the Canary Islands
starry weever
starry weever